Mohd Zahiril Adzim Mohd Mokhtar (born January 22, 1984) is a Malaysian actor who is active in film, television and theater.

Personal life
Adzim marries TV host, actress and former TV3 journalist Shera Aiyob on 20 November 2011. They have a son named Nadi Anaqi.

Filmography

Film

Television series

Telemovie

References

External links

1984 births
Living people
People from Perak
Malaysian people of Malay descent
Malaysian Muslims
Malaysian male actors
Malaysian film actors